The Cheeyappara Waterfall is on the Kochi - Madurai Highway (National Highway 49), between Neriamangalam and Adimali. It is in Idukki district, Kerala, India.

The Cheeyappara Waterfall cascades down in seven steps. This is also a great place for trekking.

See also
 Munnar
 Valara Waterfall
 Ponmudi Dam

External links
 Things To Know about Cheeyappara Falls 
 About Cheeyappara
 Info from Kerala Tourism site

Waterfalls of Idukki district
Waterfalls of Kerala
Articles containing video clips
Tourism in Idukki district
Tourist attractions in Idukki district